Rosy Sofia Akbar is a Fijian politician and former Member of the Parliament of Fiji who served as the Minister for Women, Children and Poverty Alleviation from 2021 to 2022. She is originally from Ba and before entering politics she was Vice-Principal of A.D. Patel College.

Akbar was elected to Parliament in the 2014 election, in which she won 990 votes, and was appointed Minister for Women, Children and Poverty Alleviation. Following a cabinet reshuffle in September 2016 she was appointed Minister for Health and Medical Services. She was re-elected at the 2018 election, winning 705 votes, and was appointed Minister of Education.

On 13 February 2023 she resigned from Parliament for health reasons. She was replaced by Virendra Lal.

References

Indian members of the Parliament of Fiji
FijiFirst politicians
Government ministers of Fiji
Fijian Muslims
Politicians from Ba Province
21st-century Fijian women politicians
21st-century Fijian politicians
Women government ministers of Fiji
Living people
Year of birth missing (living people)